The 1991 Women's Junior World Handball Championship was the eighth edition of the tournament which took place in France from 23 August to 1 September 1991. Seventeen teams competed in the competition from four continents with Brazil and Chinese Taipei making there first appearance in a tournament.

After 62 matches, the Soviet Union took home their seventh gold medal and their fifth in a row after defeating South Korea by a single goal in the gold-medal match. Denmark finished in third place overall after they defeated Sweden in the bronze medal playoff.

First round

Group A

Group B

Group C

Group D

Second round

Group I

Group II

Thirteenth place

Canada and Nigeria both withdrew from the competition

Placement matches

Eleventh-place game

Ninth-place game

Seventh-place game

Fifth-place game

Third-place game

Final

Ranking
The final rankings from the 1991 edition:

References

External links 

Women's Junior World Handball
Women's Junior World Handball Championship, 1991
1991
Junior Handball
Junior Handball
Women's handball in France